Marina Antonyuk (born 12 May 1962) is a Russian former track and field athlete who competed in the shot put. She represented the Soviet Union at the 1991 World Championships in Athletics, finishing seventh, and at the 1990 European Athletics Championships, coming eighth. She was a silver medallist at the 1992 IAAF World Cup behind Cuba's Belsis Laza.

Antonyuk was the 1987 national shot put champion at the Soviet Athletics Championships.

International competitions

National titles
Soviet Athletics Championships
Shot put: 1987

References

External links

Living people
1962 births
Soviet female shot putters
Russian female shot putters
World Athletics Championships athletes for the Soviet Union